"Breaking Hearts" is a song by Chara. It debuted at #28 on the Japanese Oricon album charts, and charted for three weeks.

The single was released in two versions: a limited edition featuring a DVD, plus a regular CD only version. The DVD features the music video for the song.

The B-side of the single, is an acoustic cover of the Yumi Matsutoya song of the same name.

Music video

The music video was shot by director . It begins with a red shoe floating in space. The scene changes to Chara singing in a forest. She begins to grow, and sings in places such as a high branch or above the forest, getting increasingly larger. She eventually breaks through the clouds and dances on different planets. She loses her shoes as she jumps from a planet, and disintegrates into hundreds of stars. She wakes up in a hole in the forest, with a boy in clothes far too large for him. The scene pans out, and it is shown that the hole is the heel print from one of her missing shoes.

The video was nominated for Best Female Video for the 2010 Space Shower Music Video Awards.

As of April 20, 2010 the music video for "Breaking Hearts" has been viewed 196,000 times at the two official Universal channels on popular video-sharing website YouTube.

Track listing

Single

Chart rankings

Oricon Charts (Japan)

Various charts

References 

Chara (singer) songs
2009 singles
Japanese-language songs
2009 songs
Universal Music Japan singles
Songs written by Chara (singer)